Yevgen is a given name. Notable people with the name include:

 Yevgen Bolibrukh (born 1983), Ukrainian professional racing cyclist
 Yevgen Murzin (born 1965), Ukrainian basketball coach for the Ukrainian national team
 Yevgen Rogachov (born 1983), Ukrainian futsal player
 Yevgen Sotnikov (1980–2021), Ukrainian judoka
 Yevgen Synelnykov (born 1981), Ukrainian TV presenter, director, actor
 Yevgen Zakharov (born 1952), Ukrainian human rights activist

See also
 Yevgeny

Ukrainian masculine given names